Gavrikovo is a rural locality (a village) in Kosinskoye Rural Settlement, Kosinsky District, Perm Krai, Russia. The population was 12 as of 2010. There is 1 street.

Geography 
Gavrikovo is located 37 km north of Kosa (the district's administrative centre) by road. Pyatigory is the nearest rural locality.

References 

Rural localities in Kosinsky District